Ram Janmabhoomi (literally, "Rama's birthplace") is the site that is hypothesized to be the birthplace of Rama, believed to be the seventh avatar of the Hindu deity Vishnu. The Ramayana states that the location of Rama's birthplace is on the banks of the Sarayu river in a city called "Ayodhya". Modern-day Ayodhya is in the north Indian state of Uttar Pradesh.

Some Hindus claim that the exact site of Rama's birthplace is where the Babri Masjid once stood in the present-day Ayodhya, Uttar Pradesh. According to this theory, the Mughals demolished a Hindu shrine that marked the spot, and constructed a mosque in its place.  People opposed to this theory state that such claims arose only in the 18th century, and that there is no evidence for the spot being the birthplace of Rama. Several other sites, including places in other parts of India, Afghanistan, and Nepal, have been proposed as birthplaces of Rama. The political, historical and socio-religious debate over the history and location of the Babri Mosque, and whether a previous temple was demolished or modified to create it, is known as the Ayodhya dispute.

In 1992, the demolition of the Babri Masjid by Hindu nationalists triggered widespread Hindu-Muslim violence. The legal dispute over the property reached the Indian Supreme Court, which heard the title dispute cases from August to October 2019. On 9 November 2019, the Supreme Court ordered the land to be handed over to a trust to build a Hindu temple.

Babri Masjid site 

The Ramayana, a Hindu epic whose earliest portions date back to 1st millennium BCE, states that the capital of Rama was Ayodhya. According to the local Hindu belief, the site of the now-demolished Babri Mosque in Ayodhya is the exact birthplace of Rama. The Babri mosque is believed to have been constructed during 1528–29 by a certain 'Mir Baqi' (possibly Baqi Tashqandi), who was a commander of the Mughal emperor Babur (1526–1530). However, the historical evidence for these beliefs is scant.

In 1611, an English traveller William Finch visited Ayodhya and recorded the "ruins of the Ranichand [Ramachand] castle and houses". He made no mention of a mosque. In 1634, Thomas Herbert described a "pretty old castle of Ranichand [Ramachand]" which he described as an antique monument that was "especially memorable".  However, by 1672, the appearance of a mosque at the site can be inferred because Lal Das's Awadh-Vilasa describes the location of birthplace without mentioning a temple or "castle". In 1717, the Moghul Rajput noble Jai Singh II purchased land surrounding the site and his documents show a mosque.
The Jesuit missionary Joseph Tiefenthaler, who visited the site between 1766 and 1771, wrote that either Aurangazeb (1658–1707) or Babur had demolished the Ramkot fortress, including the house that was considered as the birthplace of Rama by Hindus. He further stated that a mosque was constructed in its place, but the Hindus continued to offer prayers at a mud platform that marked the birthplace of Rama. In 1810, Francis Buchanan visited the site, and stated that the structure destroyed was a temple dedicated to Rama, not a house. Many subsequent sources state that the mosque was constructed after demolishing a temple.

Police officer and writer Kishore Kunal states that all the claimed inscriptions on the Babri mosque were fake. They were affixed sometime around 1813 (almost 285 years after the supposed construction of the mosque in 1528 CE), and repeatedly replaced.

Before the 1940s, the Babri Masjid was called Masjid-i-Janmasthan ("mosque of the birthplace"), including in the official documents such as revenue records. Shykh Muhammad Azamat Ali Kakorawi Nami (1811–1893) wrote: "the Babari mosque was built up in 923(?) A.H. under the patronage of Sayyid Musa Ashiqan in the Janmasthan temple in Faizabad-Avadh, which was a great place of (worship) and capital of Rama’s father"

H.R. Neville, the editor of the Faizabad District Gazetteer (1870), wrote that the Janmasthan temple "was destroyed by Babur and replaced by a mosque." He also wrote "The Janmasthan was in Ramkot and marked the birthplace of Rama. In 1528 A.D. Babur came to Ayodhya and halted here for a week. He destroyed the ancient temple and on its site built a mosque, still known as Babur's mosque. The materials of the old structure [i.e., the temple] were largely employed, and many of the columns were in good preservation."

Opposition to the claim 

A section of historians, such as R. S. Sharma, state that such claims of Babri Masjid site being the birthplace of Rama sprang up only after the 18th century. Sharma states that Ayodhya emerged as a place of Hindu pilgrimage only in medieval times, since ancient texts do not mention it as a pilgrim centre. For example, chapter 85 of the Vishnu Smriti lists 52 places of pilgrimage, which do not include Ayodhya.

Many critics also claim that the present-day Ayodhya was originally a Buddhist site, based on its identification with Saketa described in Buddhist texts. According to historian Romila Thapar, ignoring the Hindu mythological accounts, the first historic mention of the city dates back to the 7th century, when the Chinese pilgrim Xuanzang described it as a Buddhist site.

Proposed Ram Janmabhoomi Mandir 

In 1853, a group of armed Hindu ascetics belonging to the Nirmohi Akhara occupied the Babri Masjid site, and claimed ownership of the structure. Subsequently, the civil administration stepped in, and in 1855, divided the mosque premises into two parts: one for Hindus, and the other for Muslims.

In 1883, the Hindus launched an effort to construct a temple on the platform. When the administration denied them the permission to do this, they took the matter to court. In 1885, the Hindu Sub Judge Pandit Hari Kishan Singh dismissed the lawsuit. Subsequently, the higher courts also dismissed the lawsuit in 1886, in favour of status quo. In December 1949, some Hindus placed idols of Rama and Sita in the mosque, and claimed that they had miraculously appeared there. As thousands of Hindu devotees started visiting the place, the government declared the mosque a disputed area and locked its gates. Subsequently, multiple lawsuits from Hindus, asking for permission to convert the site into a place of worship.

In the 1980s, the Vishva Hindu Parishad (VHP) and other Hindu nationalist groups and political parties launched a campaign to construct the Ram Janmabhoomi Mandir ("Rama birthplace temple") at the site. The Rajiv Gandhi government allowed Hindus to access the site for prayers. On 6 December 1992, Hindu nationalists demolished the mosque, resulting in communal riots leading to over 2,000 deaths.

In 2003, the Archaeological Survey of India (ASI) conducted excavations of the site on court orders. The ASI report indicated the presence of a 10th-century north Indian style temple under the mosque. Muslim groups and the historians supporting them disputed these findings, and dismissed them as politically motivated. The Allahabad High Court, however, upheld the ASI's findings. The excavations by the ASI were heavily used as evidence by the court that the predating structure was a massive Hindu religious building.

In 2009, the Bharatiya Janata Party (BJP) released its election manifesto, repeating its promise to construct a temple to Rama at the site.

All the three parties appealed against the division of disputed land to the Supreme Court.

The five judges Supreme Court bench heard the title dispute cases from August to October 2019. On 9 November 2019, the Supreme Court ordered the land to be handed over to a trust to build the Hindu temple. It also ordered to the government to give alternate 5 acre land to Sunni Waqf Board to build the mosque. On 5 February 2020, the trust known as Shri Ram Janmabhoomi Teerth Kshetra was created by the government of India.

Other places 

Those who believe that Rama was a historic figure, place his birth before 1000 BCE. However, the archaeological excavations at Ayodhya have not revealed any settlement before that date. Consequently, a number of other places have been suggested as the birthplace of Rama.

In November 1990, the newly appointed Prime Minister Chandra Shekhar made an attempt to resolve the Ayodhya dispute amicably. Towards this objective, he asked Hindu and Muslim groups to exchange evidence on their claims over Ayodhya. The panel representing the Muslim organization Babri Masjid Action Committee (BMAC) included R. S. Sharma, D. N. Jha, M. Athar Ali and Suraj Bhan. The evidence presented by them included scholarly articles discussing alternative theories about the birthplace of Rama. These sources mentioned 8 different possible birthplaces, including a site other than Babri Masjid in Ayodhya, Nepal and Afghanistan. One author – M. V. Ratnam – claimed that Rama was Ramses II, a pharaoh of ancient Egypt.

In his 1992 book Ancient geography of Ayodhya, historian Shyam Narain Pande argued that Rama was born around present-day Herat in Afghanistan. In 1997, Pande presented his theory in the paper "Historical Rama distinguished from God Rama" at the 58th session of the Indian History Congress in Bangalore. In 2000, Rajesh Kochhar similarly traced the birthplace of Rama to Afghanistan, in his book The Vedic People: Their History and Geography. According to him, the Harriud river of Afghanistan is the original "Sarayu", and Ayodhya was located on its banks.

In 1998, archaeologist Krishna Rao put forward his hypothesis about Banawali being Rama's birthplace. Banawali is an Harappan site located in the Haryana state of India. Rao identified Rama with the Sumerian king Rim-Sin I and his rival Ravana with the Babylonian king Hammurabi. He claimed to have deciphered Indus seals found along the Sarasvati rivers, and found the words "Rama Sena" (Rim-Sin) and "Ravani dama" on those seals. He rejected Ayodhya as the birthplace of Rama, on the grounds that Ayodhya and other Ramayana sites excavated by B. B. Lal do not show evidence of settlements before 1000 BCE. He also claimed that the writers of the later epics and the Puranas got confused because the ancient Indo-Aryans applied their ancient place names to the new place names as they migrated eastwards.

Archaeological Survey of India Site

First Excavation 
A team of Archeological Survey of India in the leadership and B. B. Lal conducted a survey of the land in 1976–77. They found 12 pillars of the mosque that were made from the remains of a Hindu temple. The base of Pillars had Purna Kalasha which was 'ghada' (water pitcher) from which foliage would be coming out. These symbols were found in almost all the temples of 12th and 13th Century. For Hindus, it is one of the eight auspicious symbol of prosperity also known as Ashtamangala Chinha. The excavation team found many terracotta sculptures that depicted human beings and animals, a characteristic of a temple, not a mosque.

Second excavation 
In 2003, A 50 plus member team of Archeological Survey of India did the second excavation. They found over 50 pillars, hinting that below the mosque stood a Hindu temple that could be dated back to the 12th Century AD.

Temple Pranali 
The excavators further found a temple system that depicted a crocodile (a symbol of the Holy Ganga) to signify a symbolic bath in the holy rivers of the Ganges, Yamuna and Saraswati to wash off one's sins. They also got the temple 'pranali' (system). We have to bathe the deity and the 'abhisheka jal' flows through 'pranali'. This 'makara pranali' was also excavated.

Kalasha, Amalkam Grivaha and Shikhara 
The ASI team unearthed several remains of a temple's 'shikhara' (tower) from the mosque's premises, adding to the evidences of a Hindu structure underneath ASI team also found another architectural member known as 'amalka'. Below the 'amalka' there is the 'grivah' and also the 'shikhara' portion of the temple in North India.

Terracotta remains 
The ASI archaeologists found 263 pieces of terracotta objects of gods, goddesses, human figures, female figurines that consolidated the theory that it was the site of a temple.

Vishnu Hari Shila Phalak 
An inscription of 'Vishnu Hari Shila Phalak' was found on two remains found at the site that proved to be an important circumstantial evidence that stated the existence of a Hindu temple there.

Construction of Ram Mandir 

The Shri Ram Janmabhoomi Teerth Kshetra trust began the first phase of construction of the Ram Mandir on March, 2020. Prime Minister Narendra Modi performed Bhoomi Pujan and laid the foundation stone of the Ram Temple in Ayodhya on 5 August 2020.

See also

 Ram Ki Janmabhoomi, an Indian film which deals with the controversial issue of Ram Mandir
 Rama Setu

References

Bibliography

Further reading

 
 
 
 
 
 
 
 
 
 
 
 Arun Shourie, Arun Jaitley, Swapan Dasgupta, Rama J Jois: The Ayodhya Reference: Supreme Court Judgement and Commentaries. 1995. New Delhi:Voice of India. 
 Arun Shourie, Sita Ram Goel, Harsh Narain, Jay Dubashi and Ram Swarup. Hindu Temples – What Happened to Them Vol. I, (A Preliminary Survey) (1990) 
 
 
 
 History versus Casuistry: Evidence of the Ramajanmabhoomi Mandir presented by the Vishwa Hindu Parishad to the Government of India in December–January 1990–91. New Delhi: Voice of India.
 

Ayodhya
Rama
Divya Desams
Tourism in Uttar Pradesh
Ayodhya dispute